The women's 52 kg judo competitions at the 2022 Commonwealth Games in Birmingham, England took place on August 1st at the Coventry Arena. A total of ten competitors from nine nations took part.

Tinka Easton of Australia won the gold medal, defeating Kelly Deguchi of Canada in the gold medal match.

Results
The draw is as follows:

Repechages

References

External link
 
 Results
 

W52
2022
Commonwealth W52